Birks' Works is an album by trumpeter Dizzy Gillespie recorded in 1957 and released on the Verve label. The original album featured 10 tracks and was reissued as Birks Works: The Verve Big Band Sessions, a 2 CD compilation featuring unreleased tracks, alternate takes and tracks from Gillespie's previous 1956 albums Dizzy in Greece and World Statesman.

Reception
The Penguin Guide to Jazz selected the reissue compilation as part of its suggested Core Collection.
The AllMusic review awarded the album 5 stars calling it "Essential music".

Track listing
All compositions by Dizzy Gillespie except as indicated

Original LP Release
Side One:
 "Jordu" (Duke Jordan) - 4:13     
 "Birks' Works" - 4:56   
 "Umbrella Man" (Vincent Rose, Larry Stock, James Cavanaugh) - 3:02    
 "Autumn Leaves" (Joseph Kosma, Jacques Prévert, Johnny Mercer) - 3:11   
 "Tangerine" (Victor Schertzinger, Mercer) - 3:43  
Side Two:  
 "Over the Rainbow" (Harold Arlen, Yip Harburg) - 4:37    
 "Yo No Quiero Bailar" (Joe Willoughby) - 4:42    
 "If You Could See Me Now" (Tadd Dameron, Carl Sigman) - 3:30   
 "Left Hand Corner" (Ernie Wilkins) - 2:26    
 "Whisper Not" (Benny Golson, Leonard Feather) - 5:17

CD Compilation Reissue
Disc One:
 "Dizzy's Business" (Wilkins) - 3:37 Originally released on World Statesman
 "Hey Pete! Let's Eat More Meat" (Gillespie, Buster Harding, Lester Peterson) - 5:39 Originally released on Dizzy in Greece 
 "Jessica's Day" (Quincy Jones) - 4:50 Originally released on World Statesman 
 "Tour de Force" - 5:04 Originally released on World Statesman 
 "I Can't Get Started" (Vernon Duke, Ira Gershwin) - 2:55 Originally released on World Statesman 
 "Stella by Starlight" (Ned Washington, Victor Young) - 4:07 Originally released on World Statesman 
 "Doodlin'" (Horace Silver) - 3:56 Originally released on World Statesman 
 "A Night in Tunisia" -  5:34 Originally released on World Statesman 
 "The Champ" - 4:42 Originally released on World Statesman 
 "Yesterdays" (Otto Harbach, Jerome Kern) - 3:46 Originally released on Dizzy in Greece 
 "Tin Tin Deo" (Gil Fuller, Gillespie, Chano Pozo) - 4:17 Originally released on Dizzy in Greece 
 "Groovin' for Nat" (Wilkins) - 3:21 Originally released on Dizzy in Greece 
 "My Reverie" (Larry Clinton, Claude Debussy) - 2:52 Originally released on World Statesman 
 "Dizzy's Blues" (Ahmad Khatab Salim) - 2:32 Originally released on World Statesman 
 "Annie's Dance" (Melba Liston) - 4:05 Originally released on Dizzy in Greece 
 "Cool Breeze" (Dameron, Billy Eckstine, Gillespie) - 4:55 Originally released on Dizzy in Greece 
 "School Days" (Will D. Cobb, Gus Edwards) - 4:23 Originally released on Dizzy in Greece 
 "Jordu" (Jordan) - 4:13 
 "Yo No Quiero Bailar" (Willoughby) - 4:42 
Disc Two:
 "Birk's Works" - 4:56 
 "Autumn Leaves" (Kosma, Mercer, Prevert) - 3:11 
 "Tangerine" (Mercer, Schertzinger) - 3:43 
 "Over the Rainbow" (Arlen, Harburg) - 4:37 
 "Umbrella Man" (Cavanaugh, Rose, Stock) - 3:02 
 "If You Could See Me Now" (Dameron, Sigman) - 3:30 
 "Left Hand Corner" [alternate take] (Wilkins) - 0:13 Previously unreleased  
 "Left Hand Corner" [alternate take] (Wilkins) - 2:26 Previously unreleased 
 "Left Hand Corner" [alternate take] (Wilkins) - 2:16 Previously unreleased 
 "Left Hand Corner" [alternate take] (Wilkins) - 0:10 Previously unreleased 
 "Left Hand Corner" [master take]  (Wilkins) - 2:22 
 "Whisper Not" [alternate take] (Golson, Feather) - 5:52 Previously unreleased 
 "Whisper Not [alternate take] (Golson, Feather) - 5:08 Previously unreleased 
 "Whisper Not [master take] (Golson, Feather) - 5:17 
 "Stablemates" (Golson) - 4:12 Originally released on Dizzy in Greece
 "That's All" (Alan Brandt, Bob Haymes) - 3:13 Originally released on Dizzy in Greece 
 "Groovin' High" [master take] - 3:53 Originally released on Dizzy in Greece 
 "Mayflower Rock" [alternate take] (Lee Brown) - 3:17 Previously unreleased 
 "Mayflower Rock" [master take] (Brown) - 3:14 Originally released as 45rpm single B-side  
 "Joogie Boogie" - 4:14 Originally released as 45rpm single   
 "I Remember Clifford" (Golson) - 4:15 
 "You'll Be Sorry" - 2:17 Previously unreleased  
 "Wonder Why" (Nicholas Brodszky, Sammy Cahn) - 3:51 Previously unreleased

Personnel

On original LP and CD Compilation Reissue Disc One, tracks 18 & 19 and Disc Two, tracks 1-21
Dizzy Gillespie - trumpet, arranger
Talib Daawud, Lee Morgan, Ermit V. Perry, Carl Warwick - trumpet
Melba Liston - trombone, arranger
Al Grey, Rod Levitt - trombone
Ernie Henry, Jimmy Powell - alto saxophone
Benny Golson - tenor saxophone, arranger
Billy Mitchell - tenor saxophone
Billy Root - baritone saxophone
Wynton Kelly - piano
Paul West - bass
Charlie Persip - drums
Austin Cromer - vocals (on "Over the Rainbow", "You No Quiero Bailer", "If You Could See Me Now" and "Mayflower Rock")
Ernie Wilkins - arranger
Recorded in New York City on April 7 & 8, 1957

On CD Compilation Reissue Disc One, tracks 1-17
Dizzy Gillespie - trumpet, vocals
Joe Gordon, Quincy Jones, Ermit V. Perry, Carl Warwick - trumpet
Rod Levitt, Melba Liston, Frank Rehak - trombone
Jimmy Powell, Phil Woods - alto saxophone
Billy Mitchell, Ernie Wilkins - tenor saxophone
Marty Flax - baritone saxophone
Walter Davis Jr. - piano
Nelson Boyd - bass
Charlie Persip - drums 
Recorded in New York City on May 18 & 19 and June 6, 1956

On CD Compilation Reissue Disc Two, tracks 22 & 23
Dizzy Gillespie, Talib Daawud, Lee Morgan, Ermit V. Perry, Carl Warwick - trumpet
Al Grey, Melba Liston - trombone 
Ernie Henry, Jimmy Powell - alto saxophone
Billy Mitchell, Benny Golson - tenor saxophone
Pee Wee Moore - baritone saxophone
Wynton Kelly - piano
Paul West - bass
Charlie Persip - drums
Recorded in New York City on July 8, 1957

References 

Dizzy Gillespie albums
1957 albums
Verve Records albums
Albums produced by Norman Granz